"Open Arms" is a song by American singer-songwriter SZA from her second studio album, SOS (2022). Featuring vocals from American rapper Travis Scott, the song is a sentimental ballad backed by acoustic guitar, with lyrics about realizing to leave a former partner to whom the other person has been devoted because it has become harmful for their self-esteem. The song begins with a tribute to SZA's deceased grandmother, Norma Rowe, in the form of a voice recording; "Open Arms" is the only SOS track in which she appears. Rowe's vocals featured prominently on SZA's debut album, Ctrl (2017).

"Open Arms" marks Scott and SZA's fourth collaboration—a previous one was "Love Galore" (2017), the second single from Ctrl. The digital-exclusive edition of SOS, released in early 2023, contains a solo version of the song. Many contemporary critics focused on Scott's appearance in "Open Arms"; a few considered him a fitting addition, welcoming his uncharacteristically gentle tone on the third verse. The song charted in the United States, Canada, and Australia, with a number 67 peak on the Billboard Global 200, and it was included in set lists for a 19-show North American tour in promotion of SOS.

Background 

SZA released her debut studio album, Ctrl, in 2017. Primarily an R&B album that deals with themes like heartbreak, it received widespread acclaim for its vocals and eclectic musical style, as well as the emotional impact and confessional nature of its songwriting. The album brought SZA to mainstream fame, and critics credit it with establishing her status as a major figure in contemporary pop and R&B music and pushing the boundaries of the R&B genre. Her next studio album was therefore highly anticipated, and she alluded to its completion as early as August 2019 during an interview with DJ Kerwin Frost.

From April to May 2022, SZA told media outlets that she had recently finished the album in Hawaii and said that it was coming soon. Wanting to experiment with genres she had not yet incorporated in her discography, she envisioned it to be an amalgamation of various disparate musical styles, or in her words, "a little bit of everything". While some tracks had an "aggressive" sound, certain others were balladic, soft, or heartfelt. Apart from the "traditional" R&B that had been a staple of SZA's past works, the album also contained prominent elements of "acoustic singer-songwriter" music.

During the build-up to the album's release, SZA created a list of possible collaborators for the album and reached out to them through private messages. The roster ranged from Billie Eilish, Harry Styles, and Olivia Rodrigo; to Doja Cat, Drake, and Kendrick Lamar. Of the several artists she contacted for the album, only three people sent their verses: Don Toliver, Phoebe Bridgers, and Travis Scott. SZA had collaborated with Scott a few times before, specifically on her Ctrl single "Love Galore" (2017), Scott's song "Ok Alright" (2015), and the Game of Thrones soundtrack song "Power Is Power" (2019). Toliver and Bridgers appear in the tracks "Used" and "Ghost in the Machine" respectively, while Scott appears in "Low" as background vocals and "Open Arms" as a featured artist.

Music and production 

While work on SOS had begun by 2019, "Open Arms" was written and recorded in 2022 alongside a number of other songs due to bursts of productivity from time pressure. Lang commented, "that's when [we] started feeling like, hey, 'We gotta do this shit like, it's been some years.' We bottled up that energy and everything was just sort of a preparation for that moment." "Open Arms" is a sentimental ballad produced by Teo Halm, Michael Uzowuru, and Rob Bisel, backed by finger-picked acoustic guitar that puts emphasis on SZA's soft vocal performance. 

SZA wanted to include acoustic music as a major element of her second studio album, SOS (2022), refusing to be described solely as an R&B artist because she was a Black woman: "I love making Black music, period. Something that is just full of energy. Black music doesn't have to just be R&B[...] Why can't we just be expansive and not reductive?" Scott's vocals are in the lower register and digitally manipulated using AutoTune, and he performs with a gentle rap cadence, a departure from his usual sound.

The song begins with a voice clip of Norma Rowe—SZA's grandmother who died from Alzheimer's disease during recording sessions for SOS, which caused her to go through frequent depressive episodes. Like Scott, Rowe's vocals prominently featured in Ctrl; "Open Arms" is the only song on SOS in which she appears, serving as a tribute to her. Describing Rowe's appearance in the song, Nylon wrote that she helps provide "Open Arms" a heartwarming tone to contrast much of the album's other tracks which are "roiling at the brim with anger, sadness, insecurity, and loneliness."

Lyrics 

Many SOS tracks explore the conflict between SZA's desire for a new life on her own and a longing for a fulfilling romantic connection, to the detriment of her self-image. "Open Arms" is one song that features such a conflict, depicting the point of view character's continued devotion to a relationship even though it has become unhealthy for her. In the lyrics, she admits she is willing to still be with her ex-boyfriend no matter how much they are actually incompatible and no matter how much it takes a toll on her mental health, to the point where she sings in one line, "Who needs self-esteem, anyway?" According to music journalist Danyel Smith, "Open Arms" mirrors SZA's personal life in that it recalls her history with rejection from people with whom she wanted to form close friendships. In the song, the character hopes that staying with her ex-boyfriend will sate her desire of finally being liked by someone, admitting "I hate myself to make you stay / Push me away, I'll be right here."

Scott appears in the third verse as her romantic foil. He calls her his "ride-or-die" and his "favorite color", reassuring her that he will treat her as best as he can "no matter what comes between" them. A solo version of "Open Arms" replaces Scott with SZA's take on the third verse. In it, her character sings about a time she cried for one whole night, forlorn about her past relationships. Instead of feeling alone, she says, she would rather "fuck on [her] ex" again, because she believes he still loves her for who she is. Throughout the song, the two people try to welcome the other person back into their life, reluctant to leave the relationship. However, by the end of the song, SZA's character realizes that she must, in the words of XXL, "accept isolation with open arms" so that no person will break her heart again.

Release and reception 

During a Billboard cover story published in November 2022, SZA revealed the album title, as well as the release date which was scheduled sometime next month. She posted the album's track list on Twitter on December 5, and SOS was released four days later. Out of 23 songs, "Open Arms" appears as the twentieth track. Upon its release, the song charted in Canada, the United States, and Australia, with peaks at numbers 51, 54, and 81, respectively. It peaked at number 24 on the US Hot R&B/Hip-Hop Songs chart and number 67 on the Billboard Global 200. Marking its live performance debut, "Open Arms" appeared in set lists for a 19-show North American tour in support of SOS.

Much of critical commentary around "Open Arms" focused on Scott's guest feature. Some critics considered him a fitting addition on the song, welcoming his uncharacteristically gentle tone on the third verse and praising him and SZA for expanding into a more gentle, acoustic sound. In the words of Kitty Empire for The Observer, "Versatility largely wins out [in SOS]. Only SZA could find room for Travis Scott on a slow jam ballad". Variety and the Los Angeles Times found the composition of "grand and gorgeous" quality; Variety in particular deemed Scott the song's centerpiece. Other praise was directed towards his chemistry with SZA in comparison to "Love Galore" and Rowe's voice as (in tandem with Scott's feature) a "nice nod" to Ctrl. Meanwhile, writing for Time, Andrew Chow and Moises Mendez II thought Scott's contributions were tolerable at best, and Mendez was more impressed with his background vocals for "Low". XXL reported some people believed his verse was unnecessary: Sza is pouring her heart out in a song & here come Travis Scott talking about backshots... men will never be serious people,' typed one disappointed listener."

The tracking week ending January 6, 2023, marked SOS fourth week atop the Billboard 200 albums chart. There was a possibility that Taylor Swift's Midnights (2022) might overtake the album and gain the number 1 spot. On January 5, when tracking was about to end, SZA and Swift released digital versions of their albums that contained bonus material to boost both albums on the charts. In SZA's case, she released a digital-exclusive edition of SOS that can be bought only on Top Dawg Entertainment's website. It consisted of all 23 songs from the standard edition alongside 2 previously unreleased songs—the solo version of "Open Arms" was one of them.

Credits 

 Solána Rowe lead vocals, background vocals, songwriting
 Jacques Webster II lead vocals, songwriting
 Granny lead vocals
 Rob Bisel background vocals, songwriting, production, engineering, mixing
 Michael Uzowuru songwriting, production
 Teo Halm songwriting, production, drums, guitar, keyboards
 Douglas Ford songwriting
 Derek "206derek" Anderson engineering, mixing
 Katie Harvey assistant engineering
 Noah McCorkle assistant engineering
 Robert N. Johnson assistant engineering
 Shelby Epstine assistant engineering
 Dale Becker mastering

Note

Charts

Notes

References 

2020s ballads
2022 songs
SZA songs
Travis Scott songs
Songs written by SZA
Songs written by Travis Scott